Mark Romanek (born September 18, 1959) is an American filmmaker whose directing work includes feature films, television, music videos and commercials. Romanek wrote and directed the 2002 film One Hour Photo and directed the 2010 film Never Let Me Go. His most notable music videos include "Hurt" (Johnny Cash), "Closer" (Nine Inch Nails), "Can't Stop" (Red Hot Chili Peppers), "Rain" (Madonna), "Bedtime Story" (Madonna), "Scream" (Michael & Janet Jackson), "Criminal" (Fiona Apple), and "Shake It Off" (Taylor Swift). He also co-directed "Sandcastles" from Beyoncé’s Lemonade album. Romanek's music videos have won 20 MTV Video Music Awards, including Best Direction for Jay-Z's "99 Problems" and the Michael Jackson Video Vanguard Award. He has also won three Grammy Awards for Best Short Form Music Video – more than any other director.

Background
Romanek was born in Chicago, Illinois, the son of Shirlee and Marvin Romanek. He is Jewish. He credits seeing Stanley Kubrick's 2001: A Space Odyssey at the age of nine with inspiring him to become a film director. He experimented with Super 8 and 16mm film as a teenager while attending New Trier High School. There, he studied first with Kevin Dole, a local filmmaker who was already creating a form of music video on his own in the mid-1970s, and then with Peter Kingsbury, a filmmaker who had studied with experimentalists Owen Land, John Luther Schofill, and Stan Brakhage at the School of the Art Institute of Chicago. Both teachers exposed students to works by significant figures of the American avant-garde cinema, such as Maya Deren, Kenneth Anger, and Paul Sharits.

Romanek subsequently attended Ithaca College in Ithaca, New York, and graduated from its Roy H. Park School of Communications with a degree in cinema and photography. He served as second assistant director for Brian De Palma on Home Movies, an autobiographical film De Palma conceived as an exercise for his students at Sarah Lawrence College (having returned to his alma mater as an instructor of film production). On set, Romanek met Keith Gordon, playing De Palma's alter ego. Gordon remembers Romanek's entrance into film production:

Romanek released his first film, Static, in 1985. It was co-written with Gordon and starred Gordon as a man who claimed he had invented a television set capable of showing a live picture of Heaven. The film achieved something of a cult following in London and led to Romanek's first job at the helm of a music video for the British new wave group The The, who featured on the soundtrack for Static, in 1986.

Career

Music videos

After a few years writing screenplays, Romanek decided to focus on music videos and signed on with Satellite Films, a division of Propaganda Films. His subsequent work has come to be regarded as among the best of the medium. He has worked with many top-selling recording artists from different genres of popular music, and his videos have been given credit for making stars out of some. One of his notable videos was for the Nine Inch Nails song "Closer". Its critical acclaim was only matched by its controversy, with many accusing the video as being disturbing and demonic (a big reason why the video was so popular among fans). Romanek would again work with Nine Inch Nails for the song "The Perfect Drug".

Romanek directed the music videos for David Bowie's 1993 singles "Jump They Say" and "Black Tie White Noise".

Romanek was given his first Grammy Award for Best Short Form Video in 1996 for "Scream", a collaboration between the pop superstar siblings Michael Jackson and Janet Jackson. The video, which cost $7 million to make, is cited as one of the most expensive ever made.  Romanek won his second Grammy two years later, again with Janet Jackson, for her video "Got 'til It's Gone". In 2002, Romanek shot a video for Audioslave's "Cochise" in which the band performed in the midst of a prolonged pyrotechnic display of the intensity usually seen only during fireworks finales. The explosions were so loud during the night shoot in the San Fernando Valley that local police and fire departments received hundreds of calls from residents who feared that a terrorist attack was under way.

Romanek's 2002 music video for Johnny Cash's cover of Nine Inch Nails' "Hurt" has been hailed by many critics and fans alike as the most personal and moving music video ever made. The song expresses self-loathing and the futility of worldly accomplishments; this content took on a new poignancy when sung by Cash near the end of his life, quietly performing in his memorabilia-filled home, with shots of the flood-ravaged "House of Cash" museum and archival shots of a younger, cockier Cash edited in. The video was nominated for seven VMAs, winning one for cinematography, and also won Romanek his third Grammy.

Other Romanek videos that have received accolades and awards include the VMA winners "Free Your Mind" (En Vogue), "Are You Gonna Go My Way" (Lenny Kravitz), "Rain" (Madonna), "Devil's Haircut" (Beck), "99 Problems" (Jay-Z), and "Criminal" (Fiona Apple). Many others have also received nominations. In 1997, Romanek received the VMA Michael Jackson Video Vanguard Award for his contribution to the medium. Two of his music videos, "Closer" by Nine Inch Nails and "Bedtime Story" by Madonna, have been made part of the permanent collection of the Museum of Modern Art in New York City.

Romanek directed Jay-Z's performance art video for the song "Picasso Baby", which aired on HBO on August 2, 2013. The video was shot inside the Pace Gallery in New York and featured a group of personalities from the world of art, including Marina Abramović, whose 2010 performance art work "The Artist is Present" inspired the video. This marked Romanek's first music video in eight years, his last being Coldplay's video for "Speed of Sound" in 2005.

Romanek then directed "Filthy" by Justin Timberlake and "Rescue Me" by Thirty Seconds to Mars, which both premiered in 2018.

Feature films
In 2002, Romanek wrote and directed his second feature film, One Hour Photo, about a department store photo processor (performed by Robin Williams) who becomes obsessed with a family through their snapshots. The film proved to be only a moderate hit, but still established Romanek as a respected film director. Rumors spread that the studio, Fox Searchlight, had forced changes on Romanek that seriously altered the film from how he had intended it.  He has dismissed this story, however, stating that there never was a "director's cut" of One Hour Photo and that the studio did not exercise any editorial control.

Romanek was originally attached to direct The Wolfman, but when he was dropped from that production for an unknown reason, he accepted the offer to work on Never Let Me Go. Romanek was glad to get the opportunity to shoot the film, saying "From the moment I finished [reading] the novel, it became my dream to film it. Ishiguro's conception is so daring, so eerie and beautiful. Alex Garland's adaptation is sensitive and precise. The cast is perfect, the crew superb." The film was released in 2010 to mostly positive reviews and was the 28th-highest-grossing film at the box office for that week.

In April 2021, it was announced that Romanek would be returning to directing to helm the horror thriller Mother Land, his first film in 12 years. The film, which deals with a family that has been haunted by an evil spirit for years, is written by Kevin Coughlin and Ryan Grassby.

Filmography

Further reading
 Henry Keazor, Thorsten Wübbena: Video Thrills The Radio Star. Musikvideos: Geschichte, Themen, Analysen. Bielefeld 2005, p. 335ss., p. 344ss.
 "`(...) an unforgettable emotional impact´ – Jay-Z/Mark Romanek: `99 Problems´", in: Klaus Herding/Antje Krause Wahl (Eds.), Wie sich Gefühle Ausdruck verschaffen – Emotionen in Nahsicht, Taunusstein: Driesen 2007, p. 321 – 342

References

External links

 
 Mark Romanek Interview about the making of Nine Inch Nails Video "Closer"
 Johnny Cash's "Hurt" Delves Into Life of Former Hell-Raiser, MTV VMA Lens Recap
 Jay-Z Has The Guts To Get "Shot," Rick Rubin Demands To Look Cool, MTV VMA Lens Recap.  Describes the concept of Mark Romanek's first hip-hop video, Jay-Z's "99 Problems."
 Artist Series: Mark Romanek, An interview with Romanek in short-film format by Hillman Curtis.

1959 births
American music video directors
Grammy Award winners
Ithaca College alumni
Living people
New Trier High School alumni
Writers from Chicago
Film directors from Illinois
Television commercial directors
20th-century American Jews
Advertising directors
21st-century American Jews